The following lists events that happened during 2013 in the Grand Duchy of Luxembourg.

Incumbents
Monarch: Henri
Prime Minister: Jean-Claude Juncker (until 4 December), Xavier Bettel (starting 4 December)

References

 
Years of the 21st century in Luxembourg
2010s in Luxembourg
Luxembourg
Luxembourg